Karl Hyde (born 10 May 1957) is an English musician. He is a founding member of British electronic group Underworld. Hyde has also released a solo album, made albums with Brian Eno and Matthew Herbert, and contributed towards the score for the London 2012 Summer Olympics Opening Ceremony alongside Rick Smith.

He is a founding member of the multi-discipline design and film collective Tomato and has published several books.

Career 
Hyde moved to Cardiff in the late 1970s to study at Cardiff College of Art. There he formed the new wave-synthpop band Freur in 1982 with Rick Smith and Alfie Thomas. The band released two albums, Doot-Doot (1983) and Get Us out of Here (1986), before relocating to Essex, and renaming themselves Underworld. They have continued to make music since.

He contributed towards the score for the London 2012 Summer Olympics Opening Ceremony, alongside Underworld's Rick Smith who was the ceremony's Musical Director.

In January 2013, Hyde announced the release date for his debut solo album, Edgeland. It was released worldwide on 22 April that year through Universal. It was co-produced by Leo Abrahams.

In 2014, Hyde collaborated with English musician and record producer Brian Eno on the album Someday World, which was released on Warp. The first single from this album, "The Satellites", was released in March 2014. Within weeks of the album's release, it was announced that a second album, High Life, would be released on 30 June (1 July in North America), also through Warp.

Hyde's daughter Tyler performs in the experimental rock band Black Country, New Road.

Discography

With the Screen Gemz
I Just Can't Stand Cars / Teenage Teenage (7" Single, 1979)

With Freur

With Underworld

Solo album by Hyde
Edgeland (Universal, 2013) – co-produced by Leo Abrahams

Singles by Hyde
"Cut Clouds" (Universal, 2013)
"The Boy with the Jigsaw Puzzle Fingers" (Universal, 2013)

Albums with others
Someday World (Warp, 2014) – with Brian Eno
High Life (Warp, 2014) – with Brian Eno
Fatherland (Original Music from the Stage Show) (Universal, 2017) – with Matthew Herbert

Publications

Publication by Hyde
I Am Dogboy: The Underworld Diaries. London: Faber and Faber, 2016. . Contains diary entries, autobiographical writing, photographs and abstract poetry.

Publications paired with John Warwicker
Mmm ... Skyscraper I Love You: a Typographic Journal of New York. London: Booth-Clibborn, 2002. .
In the Belly of Saint Paul. Underworld Print, 2003. .

References

External links 
 

1957 births
Living people
English film score composers
English male film score composers
English electronic musicians
English new wave musicians
English male singer-songwriters
Artists from Worcester, England
Musicians from Worcester, England
Writers from Worcester, England